National Highway 91A (NH 91A) is an Indian National Highway entirely within the state of Uttar Pradesh.

See also
 List of National Highways in India (by Highway Number)
 List of National Highways in India
 National Highways Development Project

References

External links
  NH network map of India

91A
National highways in India (old numbering)